Sundaresvarar Temple, Tiruloki, is a Siva temple in Tiruloki, in Thiruvidaimarudur Taluk in Thanjavur District in Tamil Nadu (India). It is at a distance of 5 km from Thiruppanandal. This place was called as Emanallur.

Vaippu Sthalam
It is one of the shrines of the Vaippu Sthalams sung by Tamil Saivite Nayanar Appar.

Presiding deity
The presiding deity is known as Sundaresvarar. His consort is known as Akilandeswari.  The sculpture of Siva with his consort on nandhi is very beautiful in this temple.

References

External links
 மூவர் தேவார வைப்புத்தலங்கள், EmanallUr, Sl.No.52 of 139 temples
 Shiva Temples, தேவார வைப்புத்தலங்கள், ஏமநல்லூர், Sl.No.26 of 133 temples, page1

Hindu temples in Thanjavur district
Shiva temples in Thanjavur district